Vachellia caven var. dehiscens is a perennial tree native to Argentina.

References

caven var. dehiscens